Maria Júlia "Maju" Trindade Frias Devásio (born June 13, 1998), is a Brazilian  actress, model, influencer and YouTuber. In 2017 she was compared to actress and model Cara Delevingne by Vogue because of her looks and her strong presence on various social media.

She has participated in several campaigns for brands such as C&A, Hellman's, Ambev, Adidas and among other companies. Maju already has millions of followers on social networks. All this success made Maju Trindade write her first book "Maju" released in 2016.

Biography 
Maju was born in Catanduva, in the state of São Paulo. She started like a model for Adidas' Germany, in 18 year old. Became well known after her relationship with the goalkeeper Marc - Andre Ter Stegen, this relationship lasted less than a year. After their break up, she converted to Christianity for the first time at a fan event in Belo Horizonte in the year 2016. In that event Maju stated: "I discovered what my goal is here and my greatest joy is being able to tell what has happened in my life and the desire to want to share true love grows every day." The full testimony came shortly after at the Christian conference "# ASU2016" by the singer Priscilla Alcantara who encouraged her to return to Christianity.
Ter stegen married with his girlfriend Dani Yele in 2017.

Filmography

Film

Book

Awards and nominations

References

External links
 
 

1998 births
Living people
People from Catanduva
Brazilian female models
Brazilian film actresses
Brazilian Internet celebrities
Brazilian YouTubers